Holidays in Tyrol is a 1971 West German comedy film directed by Harald Reinl and starring Uschi Glas, Hans-Jürgen Bäumler and Georg Thomalla.

The film's sets were designed by the art director Sepp Rothaur.

Cast

References

External links

1971 comedy films
German comedy films
West German films
Films directed by Harald Reinl
Films about vacationing
Gloria Film films
1970s German films